The action of the Cockcroft took place on 19 August 1917, during the Third Battle of Ypres on the Western Front in the First World War. At the Battle of Langemarck (16–18 August 1917) the infantry of the 48th (South Midland) Division (Major-General Robert Fanshawe) and the 11th (Northern) Division (Major General Henry Davies) of XVIII Corps had been stopped well short of their objectives. At a conference called by General Hubert Gough, the Fifth Army commander, on 17 August, Gough and the corps commanders arranged for local attacks to be made at various points, to reach a good jumping-off line for another general attack on 25 August.

At  on 19 August, five tanks of the 1st Tank Brigade broke down or ditched; seven others advanced up the St Julian–Poelcappelle road behind a smoke barrage, their noise smothered by low-flying British aircraft. The tanks were followed by parties of the 1/8th Battalion, Royal Warwickshire Regiment, ready to occupy the strong points and pillboxes as their garrisons were overcome by the tanks.

Two of the tanks were knocked out and two crew were killed along with 13 to 14 wounded; fifteen Royal Warwicks were also wounded. In 1996, Prior and Wilson wrote that the method was hard to repeat and created unrealistic expectations of the tanks. In 2017, Nick Lloyd wrote that the attack had been "a remarkable exercise in ingenuity and imagination" which raised Tank Corps morale.

Background

German defensive tactics

Battle of Langemarck

The tanks were ordered to keep off the roads, but the approach to the front line was so boggy that the tanks were cancelled and sent back. The 145th Brigade eventually captured the last house at the north end of St Julien, taking forty prisoners and a machine-gun. Border House and the gun pits, either side of the north-east bearing St. Julien–Winnipeg road, were captured; attempts to press on were costly failures. Parties that reached Springfield Farm disappeared and the 145th Brigade suffered 

The 145th Brigade consolidated on a line from the village to the gun pits, Jew Hill and Border House. At  German troops massed around Triangle Farm and made an abortive counter-attack at  Another counter-attack after dark was repulsed at the gun pits and at  a counter-attack from Triangle Farm was defeated. The 34th Brigade captured Haanixbeer Farm and the cemetery nearby but lost the barrage and was unable to capture the Cockcroft and Bülow Farm.

Fifth Army

Major-General Oliver Nugent (36th [Ulster] Division), reported that German artillery could not bombard advancing British troops in the German forward zone, in which the German defensive positions were lightly held and distributed in depth. The advance of British troops following up had been much easier to obstruct; helping the foremost infantry was more important than counter-battery fire, even if it had failed to suppress the German guns. Nugent wanted fewer field guns in the creeping barrage and the surplus used to fire sweeping (side-to-side) barrages. Shrapnel shells should be fuzed to burst higher up, to hit the insides of shell holes; creeping barrages should be slower, with more and longer pauses, during which the barrages from field artillery and 60-pounder guns should sweep from side to side and search (move back-and-forth).

The infantry should change formation from skirmish lines to mobile company columns, equipped with a machine-gun and Stokes mortar, advancing on a narrow front, since skirmish lines were impractical in muddy crater fields and broke up under machine-gun fire. Tanks to help capture pillboxes had bogged down behind the British front-line and air support had been restricted by the weather, particularly by low cloud early on and a lack of aircraft. One aircraft per corps had been reserved for counter-attack patrol and two aircraft per division for ground attack; only eight aircraft had been available to cover the Fifth Army front and engage German counter-attacks. Signalling had failed at vital moments and deprived the infantry of artillery support, making German counter-attacks much more effective where the Germans had artillery observation. The 56th (London) Division report recommended that the depth of the advance be shortened to give more time for consolidation and to minimise the organisational and communication difficulties being caused by the muddy ground and wet weather. Artillery commanders asked for two aircraft per division exclusively to conduct counter-attack patrols.

Prelude

British preparations

At a conference with the Fifth Army corps commanders on 17 August, Gough complained that troops had failed to hold captured ground and considered court-martialling some NCOs and officers. Gough also thought that divisions had been relieved too frequently, which had exhausted fresh divisions before the attack. The corps commanders were asked to propose attacks to reach the final objectives, where their divisions had fallen short on 16 August. Lieutenant-General Claud Jacob (II Corps) wanted to attack the brown line and then the yellow line, Lieutenant-General Herbert Watts (XIX Corps) wanted to attack the purple line; Maxse (XVIII Corps) preferred to attack the dotted purple line, preparatory to attacking the yellow line along with XIX Corps.

The proposed attacks on the plethora of "lines" marked on staff maps were intended to reach good jumping off points for an attack by II, XIX and XVIII corps on 25 August. Attacking in different places and at different times, risked defeat in detail; if the artillery failed sufficiently to suppress German machine-gunners when the infantry were struggling through mud and waterlogged shell-holes, the tactics used by the infantry would be irrelevant. During the conference, patrols of the 48th (South Midland) Division advanced towards Springfield Farm and Hillock Farm to look for posts containing parties from the attack on 16 August. The reconnaissance clarified the position of the front line, which made it possible to bring a bombardment for the next attack closer to the British posts.

XVIII Corps plan

After the Battle of Langemarck, the British outpost line in the XVIII Corps area ran east and north of St Julien; about  beyond, the north bearing St Julien–Poelcapelle road and the Zonnebeke–Langemarck road, running north-west, crossed. The roads formed a triangle with a road eastwards out of St Julien, which cut the Zonnebeke–Langemarck road at the Winnipeg strong point. There was another east–west road  from the point of the triangle. British artillery had made many attempts to destroy the German fortifications; field-gun shells were ineffective and heavy artillery was inaccurate.

A dry spell had begun on 16 August and some of the fortifications were near roads, which the Germans had kept in good condition, making it possible for tanks to drive on them and engage the strong points. , a fortified farm building, had an eighty-man garrison and the Cockcroft, another fortified farm, even more; Triangle and Hillock farms were somewhat smaller. Maxse was told by the 48th (South Midland) Division brigadier-generals (Gerald Sladen, Herbert Done and Donald Watt) to expect  in an attack on the strong points. In June, the 1st Tank Brigade (Colonel Christopher Baker-Carr) had been allotted to XVIII Corps, the 3rd Tank Brigade to XIX Corps and the 2nd Tank Brigade to II Corps. Maxse consulted Baker-Carr, who claimed that a tank attack could take the farms and blockhouses for half the cost in casualties, provided that there was a smoke barrage instead of artillery-fire. At meetings on 17 and 18 August, the tank and infantry commanders agreed that the tanks, seven of which had already been moved into St Julien and camouflaged, would drive forward under a smoke barrage and silence the German machine-gunners in the blockhouses and pillboxes.

Baker-Carr formed a composite company from G Battalion, 1st Tank Brigade and held rehearsals in which the tanks attacked the fortifications from the rear, where they were most vulnerable and the lines of retreat of their garrisons could be blocked. The infantry was to follow in platoons  behind each tank, waiting for a signal (a shovel waved out of the manhole in the roof) as the signal to move up to the strong point. The gun pits, Hillock Farm, Vancouver, Triangle Farm,  and the Cockcroft were to be attacked by one tank each; two more tanks were to attack Winnipeg Cemetery and Springfield; a floater and four tanks in reserve at California Trench were to be ready for contingencies. Once the tank crews sent the signal, a company of the 1/8th Worcestershire Regiment (1/8th Worcester) from the 144th Brigade would rush forward and occupy  and Triangle Farm, as a company of the Birmingham Rifles (1/5th Battalion, Royal Warwickshire Regiment [1/5th Warwick]), 143rd Brigade, was to capture Hillock Farm.

German defences

On 31 July, the German front line north of the Ypres–Roulers railway and the  had been overrun and the garrisons lost. The division had captured most of its objectives, but the 48th (South Midland) Division on the right barely advanced . After 16 August, the Germans increased the size of regimental sectors to make more room to disperse and divided the field artillery, one part to be kept hidden and used only during big attacks.

Action

Only seven tanks of the composite company, one male tank and six female tanks, were operational when the attack began at  the others having already broken down or bogged. The tanks drove out of St Julien, one at a time towards Hillock Farm, about  up the road, which took until  the farm was found to be empty and was occupied by the 1/8th Warwick. From the road, the crew of tank  engaged the blockhouse with its Lewis guns but then returned to the rally-point with engine trouble.

At about  the crew disabled the 6-pounders, dismounted the Lewis guns and handed them to the 1/8th Warwick. The Germans in Triangle Farm held their ground until the 1/8th Warwick, covered by a tank (possibly ), got inside and fought the garrison hand-to-hand. Tank  (Second-Lieutenant Coutts) headed for the Cockcroft, the most distant objective,  from St Julien, up the Zonnebeke–Langemarck road and it took until  to reach the fortification. The crew and the garrison exchanging machine-gun fire for about  until about fifty Germans emerged from the Cockcroft and dugouts nearby, only to be shot down by machine-gun fire from the tank.

 ditched south of the Cockcroft soon after and the crew set up their Lewis guns in shell-holes nearby. As the 1/8th Warwick were nowhere to be seen, Coutts sent a messenger pigeon back with the news and two of the crew to find the troops. The 1/8th Warwick refused to advance until Coutts came back and found an officer to order sixty men forward and dig in along the Lewis gun cordon. The crew remained until  then retired after putting a guard of three rifle-bombers in the tank and camouflaging it. At the other fortified farms and strong points, merely the arrival of tanks induced the garrisons to run and the British were able to establish their own line of outposts up the west side of the St Julien–Poelcappelle road; five of the seven tanks engaged surviving to reach the rally-point.

Aftermath

Analysis

After the action, Lieutenant-Colonel J. F. C. Fuller wrote a memorandum Minor Tank and Infantry Operations against Strong Points (23 August 1917). Fuller described conventional minor tactics, combined with the methods used by the Tank Corps, that had succeeded during the battles around Ypres and which became influential in the adoption of the Single File Drill. In 1919, Williams-Ellis and Williams-Ellis wrote that the action was memorable and that a German officer had been found hanged by his men in one of the strongpoints and in 1931, Hubert Gough called the attack a "very successful little operation...". In 1995, J. P. Harris called the attack on the pillboxes "One brilliant little feat of arms....", which justified the decision made by Haig, to keep some tanks in Flanders, even after the heavy rains began in August.

In 1996, Prior and Wilson wrote that in just over two hours Maxe's "novel stratagem" had captured five formidable fortified posts, yet the method was not feasible in most of the salient. On 22 August, XVIII Corps attacked with tanks again; the objectives were too far from the roads and the tanks ditched when the crews tried to drive closer. In 2008, J. P. Harris described the operation as "brilliant" and of "amazingly low cost". In 2014, Robert Perry wrote that the operation was spectacularly successful but that it created unrealistic expectations of what the tanks could do. In 2017, Nick Lloyd wrote that the action had been "a remarkable exercise in ingenuity and imagination" and that the success raised the morale of the Tank Corps.

Casualties

In 1919, Williams-Ellis recorded fifteen wounded and two killed among the infantry; fourteen wounded among the tank crews. In the official history volume (1948), James Edmonds, the official historian, recorded slight infantry casualties with three killed and two of the seven tanks in the attack lost.  In 1996, Prior and Wilson wrote that the British had fifteen infantry and thirteen Tank Corps casualties.

Subsequent operations

On 20 August, a special gas and smoke bombardment took place on Jehu Trench, beyond Lower Star Post on the front of the 24th Division (II Corps). The 61st (2nd South Midland) Division (XIX Corps) took a German outpost near Somme Farm and on 21 August, the 38th (Welsh) Division (XIV Corps), pushed forward its left flank. The three-brigade attack on the XIX Corps front by the fresh 15th (Scottish) Division and the 61st (2nd South Midland) Division, was a costly failure. Four tanks to support the 45th Brigade on the right flank of the 15th (Scottish) Division ditched short of the front line on the Frezenberg–Zonnebeke road and four of the six survivors, starting west of the Pommern Redoubt, ditched in the front line. The 15th Division advance was soon stopped by fire from the Potsdam, Vampir, Borry Farm and Iberian Farm blockhouses; infantry who pressed on closer to the objective disappeared.

On the left flank, troops of the 44th Brigade managed to advance some way up the slope of Hill 35, assisted by two tanks, until stopped short by machine-gun fire from Gallipoli Farm. On the XVIII Corps front, the 48th (South Midland) Division and the 11th (Northern) Division were to have advanced in a thin skirmish line preceded by tanks. Ten tanks were allotted to the 48th (South Midland) Division. Behind the British front line, on the St Julien–Poelcappelle road, six of the tanks bogged down or were hit by shells and knocked out. The remaining four tanks assisted the 143rd Brigade to capture Keerselare, Vancouver Farm and Springfield Farm, the latter being re-taken soon after; two tanks helped troops of the 33rd Brigade, 11th (Northern) Division capture Bülow Farm.

Notes

Footnotes

References
Books

 
 
 
 
 
 
 
 
 
 
 
 
 
 
 
 
 

Theses

Further reading
Books
 
 
 
 

Theses

External links

 The Battle of the Cockroft: a family returns
 The Tanks at 3rd Ypres. 19th August 1917

1917 in Belgium
Battle of Passchendaele
Battles of the Western Front (World War I)
Battles of World War I involving Germany
Battles of World War I involving the United Kingdom
Conflicts in 1917
Ypres Salient
June 1917 events
Germany–United Kingdom military relations